The Tennessee Collegiate Athletic Conference (TCAC) was a former college athletic conference affiliated with the National Association of Intercollegiate Athletics (NAIA); which was predominantly for smaller, private colleges in Western and Middle Tennessee.

History
The TCAC was created in 1985 from the western division of the old Volunteer State Athletic Conference.  The charter members were Belmont University, Bethel College, Christian Brothers University, Cumberland University, David Lipscomb University, Freed–Hardeman University, Lambuth University, Martin Methodist College, Trevecca Nazarene University, and Union University.  The TCAC survived in that form until 1995 when both Belmont and Christian Brothers announced their intentions to go to the NCAA.  The remaining teams formed a new conference, the TranSouth Athletic Conference which existed until the 2012-2013 school year.

Chronological timeline
 1985 - The Tennessee Collegiate Athletic Conference (TCAC) was founded. Charter members included Belmont University, Bethel College, Christian Brothers University, Cumberland University, David Lipscomb University, Freed–Hardeman University, Lambuth University, Trevecca Nazarene University and Union University, effective beginning the 1985-86 academic year.
 1994 - Martin Methodist College (now the University of Tennessee Southern) joined the TCAC, effective in the 1994-95 academic year.
 1996 - The TCAC would cease operations as an athletic conference, effective after the 1995-96 academic year; as many schools left to join their respective new home primary conferences, effective beginning the 1996-97 academic year: Bethel (Tenn.), David Lipscomb, Freed–Hardeman, Martin Methodist, Trevecca Nazarene and Union (Tenn.) to the TranSouth Athletic Conference (TranSouth or TSAC); while Cumberland (Tenn.) and Lambuth to the Mid-South Conference (MSC); Belmont to the Division I ranks of the National Collegiate Athletic Association (NCAA) as an NCAA D-I Independent (which would later join the Atlantic Sun Conference, effective beginning the 2001-02 academic year); and Christian Brothers to the NCAA Division II ranks and the Gulf South Conference (GSC).

Member schools

Final members

Notes

Membership timeline

Sponsored sports
The TCAC sponsored 9 sports for men and women including baseball, basketball, golf, tennis, softball, and volleyball.  Bethel and Cumberland play football in the Mid-South Conference. Defunct Lambuth also played football.

Defunct college sports conferences in the United States
College sports in Tennessee